Furphy is a surname. Notable people with the surname include:

 Dan Furphy (born 20th century), American politician in Wyoming
 John Furphy (1842–1920), Australian blacksmith who manufactured the Furphy Farm Water Cart
 Joseph Furphy (1843–1912), Australian author and poet
 Keith Furphy (born 1958), English soccer player in the US
 Ken Furphy (1931–2015), English football player and manager
 Willie Furphy (born 1986), English footballer in Scotland

See also
 Furphy, an erroneous or improbable story based on rumour